Thorp Arch Bridge (sometimes known locally as Boston Spa Bridge) is a stone arch bridge opened in 1770 across the River Wharfe linking the West Yorkshire villages of Boston Spa on the southbank and Thorp Arch on the north.

Description
Thorp Arch bridge has five arched spans, two of which are over the current course of the river Wharfe is built of Ashlar magnesian limestone.  The central arch has triangular cutwaters which accommodate pedestrian refuges in the parapets (the bridge has a footpath only to its upstream side), the remaining piers have cutwaters terminating in offsets.

The bridge carries the 7 bus route from Harrogate to Leeds via Wetherby, which is operated by the Harrogate Bus Company.

Cracks

In February 2022, the bridge was briefly closed due to cracks appearing in the road surface.

See also
 List of crossings of the River Wharfe
 Listed buildings in Boston Spa
 Listed buildings in Thorp Arch

References

External links

 British Listed Buildings

Bridges in West Yorkshire
Grade II listed buildings in West Yorkshire
Grade II listed bridges
River Wharfe
Boston Spa